Srinjoy Bose (born 17 March 1976) is the Secretary of Mohun Bagan A.C. and one of the directors of ATK Mohun Bagan Pvt. Ltd. He was a politician representing Trinamool Congress and was elected as a member of Rajya Sabha from West Bengal in 2011.

During 2015, he quit politics by resigning his Rajya Sabha seat in the fallout from the Saradha Group financial scandal. He also resigned as the editor of Jago Bangla and quit the Trinamool Congress. He is the owner of Sangbad Pratidin, a Bengali Newspaper and an advisor to Radio Asia- the first Malayalam Radio Station in the Gulf. He has authored the book "Mahakarane Mamata" (মহাকরণে মমতা).

References

External links
 Srinjoy Bose Rajya Sabha Biography

Trinamool Congress politicians from West Bengal
Rajya Sabha members from West Bengal
Living people
1976 births
Politicians from Kolkata
21st-century Indian politicians
Journalists from West Bengal
People charged with corruption